Henry L. Shrewsbury (born c. 1847) was an American teacher and Reconstruction era state legislator in South Carolina. He was described as a free mullato, and represented Chesterfield County in the South Carolina House of Representatives from 1868 until 1870.

Amelia Ann Shrewsbury was his sister. He taught at a school established by the American Missionary Association after the American Civil War.

He ran the Freedman Bureau office in Cheraw, South Carolina. He was a delegate to the 1868 South Carolina Constitutional Convention. He was appointed and election commissioner for Chesterfield County, South Carolina in October 1868.

The Chesterfield Democrat gave a favorable accounting of his integrity as a politician.

References

Republican Party members of the South Carolina House of Representatives
African-American state legislators in South Carolina
19th-century American politicians
African-American politicians during the Reconstruction Era
1840s births
Schoolteachers from South Carolina
19th-century American educators
Radical Republicans
African-American schoolteachers